Go Soeda won the first edition of the tournament after beating Tatsuma Ito 6–3, 6–0 in the final.

Seeds

Draw

Finals

Top half

Bottom half

References
 Main Draw
 Qualifying Draw

OEC Kaohsiung - Singles
2012 Singles
2012 in Taiwanese tennis